Lahndi may refer to:

 Lahnda, a language group of Pakistan
 Lahndi (food), a meat dish of Afghanistan and Pakistan